Pedicularis attollens is a species of flowering plant in the family Orobanchaceae known by the common name little elephant's head lousewort. It is native to Oregon and California, where it grows in moist mountainous areas such as meadows and bogs. The leaves are comblike, divided into many linear lobes. The inflorescence is a raceme occupying the top of the stem. The sepals of the flowers and the bracts between them are woolly. It is pink or purplish in color with darker stripes.

External links
 
Jepson Manual Treatment
USDA Plants Profile
Photo gallery

attollens
Flora of California
Flora of Oregon
Flora without expected TNC conservation status